Nurov (Russian: Нуров) is a Russian masculine surname originating from the Turkic word nur meaning ray; its feminine counterpart is Nurova. The surname may refer to
Georgi Nurov (born 1992), Russian football forward
Magomedgadzhi Nurov (born 1993), Macedonian freestyle wrestler

References

Russian-language surnames